Michał Rakoczy (born 30 March 2002) is a Polish professional footballer who plays as a midfielder for Ekstraklasa club Cracovia.

Club career
On 25 September 2020, he joined Puszcza Niepołomice on a season-long loan.

Honours
Cracovia
Polish Cup: 2019–20

Individual
Ekstraklasa Young Player of the Month: July 2022

References

2002 births
People from Jasło
Living people
Association football midfielders
Polish footballers
Poland youth international footballers
Poland under-21 international footballers
MKS Cracovia (football) players
Puszcza Niepołomice players
Ekstraklasa players
I liga players
III liga players